Joel D. Block (born 1943) is a psychologist and author on relationships and sexuality.  Block is an assistant clinical professor of psychiatry at Hofstra Northwell School of Medicine. He is also a senior psychologist at Northwell Health, where he was the training supervisor of the hospital's Sexuality Center for twenty years, until 2002.

Early life and education
Block was born in 1943 in Brooklyn, New York, and later attended the State University of New York Upstate Medical University, where he obtained a Bachelor of Science in Education/Psychology in 1970. He obtained a Master of Science degree in psychology, and later went on to obtain his doctorate in psychology from Syracuse University. He also undertook a one-year postdoctoral fellowship in Cognitive Behavioral Therapy from the Albert Ellis Institute.

Author
Block's books include:

The Other Man, The Other Woman: Understanding and Coping with Extramarital Affairs, Grosset & Dunlap, 1978
To Marry Again, Grosset & Dunlap, 1979 
Friendship, Macmillan, 1983
Secrets of Better Sex, Parker/Simon & Schuster, 1996, 
The Romance of Sex, Parker/Simon & Schuster, 1997, 
Sex Over 50, Parker/Simon & Schuster, 1999, (updated and reissued, 2008), 
Broken Promises, Mended Hearts: Maintaining Trust in Love Relationships, Contemporary/McGraw-Hill, 2000,
Step-living for Teens, Adams Media, 2001
Mommy or Daddy, Whose side Am I On, Adams Media, 2002, 
Naked Intimacy: How to Increase True Openness in Your Relationship, Contemporary/McGraw-Hill, October 2002,
Staying Cool: A Teen Guide to Getting a Grip on Anger, Wellness Institute, 2002, 
Making it Work When You Work a Lot: 10 Power Strategies for Connecting as a Couple, Kensington, 2005 
The Art of the Quickie: Fast Sex, Fast Orgasm/Anywhere, Anytime, Quiver, 2006 
The Real Reasons Men Commit: Why He Will—or Won’t—Love, Honor and Marry You, Adams Media, 2008 
Sex Comes First: 15 Ways to Save Your Relationship…without leaving the bedroom, Adams Media, 2009 
Cracking the Love Code:  A Journey of Discovery, Pop Psych Literary, 2011
The Wrong Schwartz, Pop Psych Literary, 2011
Casualties of Love, Pop Psych Literary, 2011
Saving My Life:  A Least Likely to Succeed Success Story, Pop Psych Literary

References

External links

1943 births
Living people
21st-century American psychologists
American psychology writers
State University of New York Upstate Medical University alumni
Syracuse University alumni
20th-century American psychologists